Liberalize may refer to:
 Liberalism, a political philosophy or worldview founded on ideas of liberty and equality
 Liberalization, relaxation of government restrictions, usually in areas of social, political and economic policy